Bob Stewart (born February 3, 1945) is an American jazz tuba player and music teacher.

Early life and education 
Stewart was born in Sioux Falls, South Dakota. He earned a Bachelor of Arts degree in music education from the Philadelphia College of the Performing Arts and a Master of Education from Lehman College.

Career 
Stewart taught music in Pennsylvania public schools and at Fiorello H. LaGuardia High School in New York City. He is now a professor at the Juilliard School and is a distinguished lecturer at Lehman College.

Stewart has toured and recorded with such artists as Charles Mingus, Gil Evans, Carla Bley, Muhal Richard Abrams, David Murray, Taj Mahal, Dizzy Gillespie, McCoy Tyner, Freddie Hubbard, Don Cherry, Nicholas Payton, Wynton Marsalis, Charlie Haden, Lester Bowie, Bill Frisell and many others in the United States, Europe, and Eastern Asia.

He was a frequent collaborator with saxophonist Arthur Blythe from the 1970s into the early 2000s, often taking the place of the string bass that traditionally supports a jazz ensemble. In their review of Blythe's album Lenox Avenue Breakdown, the editors of The Penguin Guide to Jazz called Stewart's title track solo "one of the few genuinely important tuba statements in jazz."

Discography

As leader
1987: First Line (JMT)
1988: Goin' Home (JMT)
2000: Then & Now (Postcards) with Taj Majal, Carlos Ward, Steve Turre, and Graham Haynes
2008: Heavy Metal Duo: Work Songs and Other Spirituals

As sideman
With Ahmed Abdullah's Diaspora and Francisco Mora Catlett's AfroHORN
 Jazz: A Music of the Spirit (Amedian, 2019)
With Ray Anderson
It Just So Happens (Enja, 1987)
With Arthur Blythe
Metamorphosis (1977)
The Grip (1977)
Bush Baby (1978)
Lenox Avenue Breakdown (Columbia, 1979)
Illusions (1980)
Blythe Spirit (1981)
Elaborations (1982)
Light Blue: Arthur Blythe Plays Thelonious Monk (1983)
Night Song (Clarity, 1997)
Spirits in the Field (Savant, 2000)
Focus (Savant, 2002)
Exhale (Savant, 2003)
With Henry Butler
The Village (1987, Impulse!)
With Uri Caine
The Sidewalks of New York: Tin Pan Alley (Winter & Winter, 1999)
The Goldberg Variations (Winter & Winter, 2000)
With Don Cherry
Multikuti (A&M, 1990)
With Gil Evans
There Comes a Time (RCA, 1975)
Priestess (Antilles, 1977 [1983])
Gil Evans Live at the Royal Festival Hall London 1978 (RCA, 1979)
With Bill Frisell
Rambler
With Dizzy Gillespie and Machito
Afro-Cuban Jazz Moods (Pablo, 1975)
With Chris Joris
Songs For Mbizo (VKH Tonesetters, 1991 and Jazz Halo/Omnitone, 2002) – with 1976 recordings
With David Murray
Live at Sweet Basil Volume 1 (Black Saint, 1984)
Live at Sweet Basil Volume 2 (Black Saint, 1984)
David Murray Big Band (DIW/Columbia, 1991)
With Charles Mingus
Let My Children Hear Music (Columbia, 1972)
Charles Mingus and Friends in Concert (Columbia, 1972)
With Sam Rivers
Crystals (Impulse!, 1974)
Culmination (BMG France, 1999)
With Herb Robertson
Shades of Bud Powell (JMT, 1988)

References

External links
 Odyssey of a Tuba Jazz Master: Interview with Bob Stewart by Sérgio Carolino
 Interview with Bob Stewart on Tuba News, written by Sergio Carolino.
 Bob Stewart Official Website

1945 births
Living people
American jazz tubists
American male jazz musicians
20th-century tubists
21st-century tubists
20th-century American musicians
21st-century American musicians
People from Sioux Falls, South Dakota
Musicians from South Dakota
Postcards Records artists
University of the Arts (Philadelphia) alumni
Lehman College alumni
20th-century American male musicians
21st-century American male musicians
Globe Unity Orchestra members
JMT Records artists
NoBusiness Records artists
Jazz musicians from South Dakota